= TCHPHNX =

Tchphnx (pronounced Touchphonics) is most known for his production work within the drum and bass, breakbeat, and hip hop genres. He is also an active DJ and turntablist. He resides in San Francisco, California. He co-founded the record label Elevated Press Records in 2009. The label currently releases his own material along with various other artists. Starting in 2013, Tchphnx began releasing material under the new stripped back spelling to avoid trademark infringement.

== Discography ==
=== Albums ===
- New Beginnings (2013)

=== Singles and EPs ===
- "OG Roots" (2013)
- "A Million Pieces" feat. Alex Lee (2012)
